Northumberland County Cricket Club is one of twenty minor county clubs within the domestic cricket structure of England and Wales. It represents the historic county of Northumberland.

The team is currently a member of the Minor Counties Championship Eastern Division and plays in the MCCA Knockout Trophy. Northumberland played List A matches occasionally from 1971 until 2005 but is not classified as a List A team per se. 

The club is based at Osborne Avenue, Jesmond and also plays matches around the county at Benwell Park and at the South Northumberland CC ground at Gosforth.

Honours
 Minor Counties Championship (0) - ; shared (0) - 
 MCCA Knockout Trophy (1) - 2006

Earliest cricket
Cricket probably reached Northumberland during the 18th century.  According to Bowen, the earliest reference to cricket in the county was in 1766.

Origin of club
A county organisation existed in 1834.  The present Northumberland CCC was founded in December 1895 and joined the Minor Counties Championship in the second season of the competition, 1896. It has remained there ever since with the exception of 1898, when it did not compete.

Club history

Northumberland has never won the Minor Counties Championship.

Northumberland won the MCCA Knockout Trophy for the first time in August 2006, beating Dorset in the final.

Notable players
The following Northumberland cricketers made an impact on the first-class game:
 Leslie Townsend
 Stan Worthington
 Eddie Phillipson
 Colin Atkinson
 Jack van Geloven
 Norman Graham
 Ben Harmison
 Mark Wood

For a complete list of players who appeared in List A cricket for Northumberland, see List of Northumberland CCC List A players.

References

 Northumberland County Cricket Club website
 Minor Counties Cricket Association Official Site

Further reading
 Rowland Bowen, Cricket: A History of its Growth and Development, Eyre & Spottiswoode, 1970
 G B Buckley, Fresh Light on 18th Century Cricket, Cotterell, 1935
 E W Swanton (editor), Barclays World of Cricket, Guild, 1986
 Playfair Cricket Annual – various editions
 Wisden Cricketers' Almanack – various editions

 
National Counties cricket
History of Northumberland
Cricket clubs established in 1895
Cricket in Northumberland
1895 establishments in England